The Mrs. Margaret Sieben House is a historic residence located north of Baldwin, Iowa, United States.  It is one of over 217 limestone structures in Jackson County from the mid-19th century, of which 101 are houses.  This is one of the largest stone houses built in that era, but what makes it unique is the use of ashlar blocks for the major elevations.  It also features "high style" elements such as the denticulated cornice.  There is a wing on the south side of the house with an enclosed wooden porch.  The house is located at the end of a long lane facing a gently sloping hillside.  Margaret Sieben was a native of Oldenberg, Germany who settled in Jackson County in 1850 and married Diederick Sieben, also a German immigrant, the following year.  After his death in 1861 she ran the farm herself, and had this house built in 1869.  The house was listed on the National Register of Historic Places in 1992.

References

Houses completed in 1869
Vernacular architecture in Iowa
Houses in Jackson County, Iowa
National Register of Historic Places in Jackson County, Iowa
Houses on the National Register of Historic Places in Iowa